Treumann is a German language surname. Notable people with the surname include:

 Jaan Treumann (1881–1941), Estonian Lutheran clergyman, educator, and politician
 Karl Treumann (1823–1877), Austrian actor, operetta singer, theatre director, and writer
 Louis Treumann (1872–1943), Austrian actor and operetta tenor
 Wanda Treumann (1883-1963), German actress and film producer 

German-language surnames